Sadat Mahalleh (also Romanized as Sādāt Maḩalleh) is a village in Lavij Rural District, Chamestan District, Nur County, Mazandaran Province, Iran. At the 2006 census, its population was 100, in 22 families.

References 

Populated places in Nur County